Buddhisagarsuri (1874 – 1925) was a Jain ascetic, philosopher and author from British India. Born in a Hindu family, he was influenced by a Jain monk and later was initiated in asceticism, and later elevated to the title of Acharya. He wrote more than hundred books.

Biography

Buddhisagarsuri was born Bechardas Patel in a Hindu family of Shivabhai and Ambaben in 1874 at Vijapur in north Gujarat. He studied till sixth standard. He met Muni Ravisagar, a Jain monk, and became his disciple. He studied at the Yashovijayji Jain Sanskrit Pathshala, a school for religious studies, in Mehsana. He took a job of religious teacher in Ajol. Following death of Ravisagar in 1898, his spiritual quest intensified. Ravisagar's disciple, Sukhsagar initiated him as a Jain monk in 1901. He was given a new name, Muni Buddhisagar. He was conferred with an informal title of Yoga-nishtha, literally "firm in Yoga". He was elevated to the title of Acharya in 1914 in Mansa. He established the Mahudi Jain temple in 1917. He was invited by the royals of Baroda, Idar and Pethapur to preach there. He died at Vijapur in 1925. The Jain temple and a memorial shrine were built where Buddhisagarsuri was later cremated in Vijapur.

Works
He wrote more than hundred books. He has written about 2000 poems. He has written a large number of poems about Sabarmati river. His first book was Jain Dharma Khristi Dharmano Mukablo, a comparison between Jainism and Christianity. He criticised Christianity and its missionary activities in Gujarat.

He was involved in several debates regarding icon worship during those time. He defended it and authored a booklet Jain Sutroma Murtipuja (Icon Worship in Jain Scriptures). He termed icons as a form of love and devotion.

Selected works
 Samadhi Shatak, a hundred stanza on meditation
 Yog Deepak, the guide on yoga
 Dhyan Vichar, a book on meditation
 Adhyatma Shanti,  a work on spiritual peace
 Karmayog, a theory of karma
 Adhyatma Geeta
 Atma Shakti Prakash
 Atma Darshan
 Shuddhopayog
 Samya Shatak
 Shishyopanishad
 Atmana Shasan
 Anandghan Pad Bhavarth Sangrah, a collection of hymns of Anandghan, a Jain mystic poet, and its meaning
 Shrimad Devchandraji, a biography of Devchandra
 Kumarapala Charitra, a biography of Chaulukya ruler Kumarapala
 Yashovijay Charitra, a biography of Yashovijay
 Adhyatma Bhajan Sangrah 1–14,  a collection of songs

References

People from Mehsana district
20th-century Indian philosophers
1874 births
1925 deaths
20th-century Indian Jain writers
Indian Jain monks
20th-century Indian Jains
20th-century Jain monks
20th-century Indian monks
Gujarati-language writers
Śvētāmbara monks